Perth Airport is an eastern suburb of Perth, the capital city of Western Australia. Its local government areas are the City of Belmont, the City of Swan (north) and the City of Kalamunda (east). It is located approximately 12 km east of the central business district. The suburb is the home of Perth Airport, the main international airport of Perth.

Climate

Perth Airport is home to a Bureau of Meteorology weather station. Perth Airport has a Mediterranean climate (Köppen climate classification Csa), like the rest of Perth.

References 

Suburbs of Perth, Western Australia

Perth Airport